Jürgen Hofmann (born 3 October 1958) is a German bobsledder. He competed in the four man event at the 1980 Winter Olympics.

References

1958 births
Living people
German male bobsledders
Olympic bobsledders of West Germany
Bobsledders at the 1980 Winter Olympics
Sportspeople from Heidelberg